Rubén Adrian Knulst (born 5 January 1973) is an Argentine former rower. He competed in the men's quadruple sculls event at the 1996 Summer Olympics.

References

External links
 

1973 births
Living people
Argentine male rowers
Olympic rowers of Argentina
Rowers at the 1996 Summer Olympics
Place of birth missing (living people)
Pan American Games medalists in rowing
Pan American Games gold medalists for Argentina
Pan American Games silver medalists for Argentina
Rowers at the 1995 Pan American Games
Rowers at the 1999 Pan American Games
People from Zárate, Buenos Aires
Sportspeople from Buenos Aires Province
Medalists at the 1999 Pan American Games
20th-century Argentine people